Metadentobunus is a genus of harvestmen in the family Sclerosomatidae, native to Taiwan.  The genus traditionally consisted of just one species with two subspecies: M. formosae formosae and M. formosae garampiensis.  However, a 2018 study by Chen and Shih identified a new species, Metadentobunus brevispinus, and raised the two prior subspecies up to separate species.

Species
 Metadentobunus formosae Roewer, 1915
 Metadentobunus garampiensis Suzuki, 1944
 Metadentobunus brevispinus Chen & Shih, 2018

References

Harvestmen
Endemic fauna of Taiwan